Bruce Alan Woyan (June 14, 1959 – February 7, 1992) was an American professional wrestler, better known by his ring name, Buzz Sawyer.

Professional wrestling career

Sawyer started wrestling in 1978 (other sources state 1979) in the National Wrestling Alliance (NWA) affiliate Jim Crockett Promotions. He stayed there with some stints in Georgia Championship Wrestling until 1984. He mainly teamed with his brother, Brett Sawyer. Buzz had a feud with The Road Warriors after he left their manager Paul Ellering's Legion of Doom. Pez Whatley was the first wrestler to pin Sawyer on live television. He also had an epic feud with Tommy Rich that led to many bloody matches, the greatest of which occurred on was billed as the "Last Battle of Atlanta" and for the first time featured a completely enclosed cage; Rich won the match. It also featured manager Paul Ellering suspended 20 feet above the ring in a smaller cage. This is the match that Shawn Michaels credits for inspiring the Hell in the Cell concept used by WWE. The stipulation for this match was that Sawyer and Rich would never wrestle one another again. Tommy Rich lost a match to Ted DiBiase in which the stipulation was a loser leaves town match. Rich appeared the next week on TV under a mask and calling himself the mysterious Mr. R. WWE released the entire match on the WWE Network on September 5, 2016.

Sawyer had a short World Wrestling Federation (WWF) run in 1984 as "Bulldog" Buzz Sawyer (since the moniker Mad Dog was being used by Maurice Vachon) with Captain Lou Albano as his manager. Sawyer's gimmicks included a dog chain, a lot of barking, and a new bulldog finisher. After his WWF stint, he surfaced in the NWA territory Championship Wrestling from Florida, under the mind control of Kevin Sullivan. He feuded with Mike Graham, Dusty Rhodes, and Adrian Street. In 1985, Buzz went to Mid-South Wrestling (which became the Universal Wrestling Federation in 1986) and became a protégé of Dick Slater's. After Slater won the North American title, he gave the Mid-South TV title to Sawyer to defend for him. The promotion tricked Slater into letting Sawyer defend the North American title (which he promptly lost), and Sawyer then refused to give the TV belt back to Slater.

In 1986, Sawyer left the UWF for World Class Championship Wrestling. He formed a team with Matt Borne and they won the WCWA Tag Team Championship. He also won the WCWA Television Championship and the WCWA Texas Heavyweight Championship and feuded with Brian Adias while there. He got into a feud with Dingo Warrior and he lost his tag team titles, with Master Gee substituting for him, to Warrior and Lance Von Erich before reportedly being fired after failing a drug test. He returned to WCW in 1989 as part of Gary Hart's J-Tex Corporation that was feuding with the Four Horsemen, and he had several matches against Arn Anderson. He then joined Kevin Sullivan's "Slaughterhouse" stable in 1990. At the Wrestle War event in 1990, he was victorious in a tag team match where he and Sullivan defeated The Dynamic Dudes (Shane Douglas and Johnny Ace), but also fractured his wrist. He left WCW in 1991.

Personal life
Sawyer was a graduate from Dixie M. Hollins High School, where he was a state champion in the 191.5 pound weight class. In 1976, he placed third nationally, losing in the semifinal to eventual champion Dan Severn. He would use his amateur skills, while in New Japan Pro-Wrestling in 1989, against the Soviet amateurs Salman Hashimikov, Victor Zangiev, Vladimir Berkovich and Wahka Evloev, that joined the promotion.

Sawyer was known for his antics both in and out of the ring, including his drug abuse and fighting with police outside a bar. Most notably, he was known for scamming aspiring wrestlers who wanted to be trained by him - Sawyer would often take their money, beat them senseless, then skip town.  Mark "The Undertaker" Calaway recounted on Joe Rogan's podcast The Joe Rogan Experience that he was a victim of this scam, however also highlighted that at that time this was a common way to whittle prospective wrestlers to only those dedicated to becoming professional wrestlers (though Calaway also indicated Sawyer's service was still a scam). Jim Cornette has stated his reason for breaking Buzz's nose with a tennis racket during a spot was due to him taking liberties with other talent (Cornette included, as Sawyer threw a shoot punch at Cornette during a match).

Death
Sawyer died at his Sacramento, California apartment from heart failure due to a drug overdose on February 7, 1992.

Championships and accomplishments

Continental Wrestling Association
AWA Southern Heavyweight Championship (1 time)
Georgia Championship Wrestling
NWA National Heavyweight Championship (1 time)
NWA National Tag Team Championship (2 times) – with Brett Sawyer
Mid-Atlantic Championship Wrestling
NWA Mid-Atlantic Tag Team Championship (1 time) – with Matt Borne
Mid-South Wrestling Association / Universal Wrestling Federation
Mid-South North American Heavyweight Championship (1 time)
UWF World Television Championship (1 time)
Pacific Northwest Wrestling
NWA Pacific Northwest Tag Team Championship (1 time) – with Brett Sawyer
Pro Wrestling Illustrated
PWI ranked him # 185 of the 500 best singles wrestlers during the "PWI Years" in 2003.
Southeastern Championship Wrestling
NWA Southeastern Television Championship (1 time)
World Class Wrestling Association
WCWA Television Championship (1 time)
WCWA Texas Heavyweight Championship (1 time)
WCWA World Tag Team Championship (1 time) – with Matt Borne
Wrestling Observer Newsletter
Most Underrated Wrestler (1981)
Best Heel (1982)
WWE
WWE Hall of Fame (Class of 2021)

References

External links

 
 

1959 births
1992 deaths
20th-century American male actors
American male professional wrestlers
Professional wrestlers from Florida
Professional wrestling trainers
Sportspeople from St. Petersburg, Florida
WWE Hall of Fame Legacy inductees
20th-century professional wrestlers
NWA National Heavyweight Champions
NWA National Tag Team Champions